Ruth, Lady Herbert Lewis, OBE ( Caine; 29 November 1871 – 26 August 1946) was an English temperance movement activist of Manx descent and collector of Welsh folk songs. She published collections of Welsh folk songs, and was a key member of the Welsh Folk-Song Society in the first half of the 20th century.

Early life and education
Ruth Caine was born in Liverpool, the daughter of William Sproston Caine and Alice Brown Caine.  Her father was a Member of Parliament. She attended Newnham College, Cambridge, but as Cambridge did not award degrees to women at the time, she was given a master's degree by the University of Dublin.

Folk music
After she married a Welsh politician, she moved to Wales, learned to speak Welsh, and committed herself to learning Welsh culture. In 1906, she was one of the charter members of the Welsh Folk-Song Society (Cymdeithas Alawon Gwerin), and in 1930 she was elected to a term as president of the society. She and other Society members collected wax cylinder recordings of Welsh-language traditional songs, and published a journal of their findings.

Books authored by Ruth Herbert Lewis include Folk-Songs Collected in Flintshire and the Vale of Clwyd (1914) and Second Collection of Welsh Folk-Songs Collected by Lady Herbert Lewis (1934).

Social reform
Ruth, Lady Herbert Lewis was active in the North Wales Women's Temperance Union. She also ran an all-night canteen for soldiers in Westminster during World War I. She received an OBE for her work during the war.

Personal life and legacy
Ruth Caine married Sir John Herbert Lewis in 1897. They lived in Caerwys and in London, and had two children together, Kitty and Mostyn. Ruth was widowed in 1933, and died in 1946, age 75.

Her wax cylinder recordings survive in the archives at the St Fagan's National History Museum in Cardiff, National Museum Wales, and at the British Library. Other materials relating to Lady Herbert Lewis are at Bangor University, the National Library of Wales and Flintshire Record Office.

Both of her children, Kitty Lewis (Mrs. Idwal Jones) and Dr. Herbert Mostyn Lewis, carried on her work and serve terms as president of the Welsh Folk-Song Society. The National Eisteddfod has an annual "Lady Herbert Lewis Memorial Competition" for adult solo folk singers.

References

1871 births
1946 deaths
19th-century English people
19th-century English women
20th-century English writers
20th-century English women writers
20th-century Welsh writers
20th-century Welsh women writers
Writers from Liverpool
English people of Manx descent
English temperance activists
English folk-song collectors
English activists
English women activists
Welsh folk-song collectors
Welsh activists
Welsh women activists
People from Caerwys
Alumni of Newnham College, Cambridge
Women folklorists
Officers of the Order of the British Empire
Steamboat ladies
Wives of knights